Advanced Placement (AP) Comparative Government and Politics (also known as AP CoGo or AP CompGov) is an Advanced Placement comparative politics course and exam offered by the College Board. It was first administered in 1987.

Course
To better match a typical introductory college course, changes were made to the course and the exam in the fall of 2005.  These changes include the following:

 Greater emphasis on analysis of concepts and themes
 Shifting focus to coverage of six core countries: China, Iran, Mexico, Nigeria, Russia, and the United Kingdom (France and India were eliminated)
 Emphasis on themes such as citizen-state relations, democratization, globalization, political change, and public policy

Nations examined
The countries whose politics, political institutions, policy making, and political cultures are examined are the following:

 (Nigeria)
 (Iran)
 (China)
 (Russia)
 (United Kingdom)
 (Mexico)

Former countries on the AP exam are the following:

Note: For testing purposes, the College Board uses the names in parentheses when making reference to these sovereign entities.

Exam
(Changed for the 2020 exam)

 55 multiple choice questions in 60 minutes
 50% of score
 Each question will have 4 options.
 There will be 2 text-based sources, each one accompanied by 2-3 questions.
 There will be 3 quantitative sources, each one accompanied by 2-3 questions.
 4 free response questions in 90 minutes
 50% of score
1 conceptual analysis question
 1 quantitative analysis question
 1 comparative analysis question
 1 argument essay requiring students to write an argument-based essay utilizing recalled evidence

Topics 
Political Systems, Regimes, and Governments (18-27%)
Political Institutions (22-33%)
Political Culture and Participation (11-18%)
Party and Electoral Systems and Citizen Organizations (13-18%)
 Political and Economic Changes and Development (16-24%)

Grade distribution

References
AP Comparative Government and Politics at CollegeBoard.com

Academic transfer
Political science education
Advanced Placement